Brisbane Bitter (also known as Brisbane River) was a heavy beer originating, as the name suggests, in Brisbane, Australia. It was initially introduced by Carlton & United Breweries in the 1970s. The beer was aimed at the youth market. The can had a picture of Story Bridge in Brisbane.

See also

Australian pub
Beer in Australia
List of breweries in Australia

References

Australian beer brands
Culture of Brisbane
Products introduced in 1977
1977 in Australia